Anatoly Martinov is a Soviet flatwater canoeist who competed in the late 1960s. He won a bronze medal in the C-1 1000 m event at the 1966 ICF Canoe Sprint World Championships in East Berlin, East Germany (now Berlin, Germany).

References

Living people
Soviet male canoeists
Year of birth missing (living people)
ICF Canoe Sprint World Championships medalists in Canadian